Saarte Hääl is a daily newspaper published in Saare County, Estonia. Before 4 May 2010 it bore the name of Oma Saar.

The publisher is TÜ Oma Saar.

Newspapers named Saarte Hääl has also been published 1940–1950 and 1988–1992.

External links
 

Newspapers published in Estonia
Saare County